Banović is a Serbian and Croatian surname. 

 Boris Banović (born 1973), Croatian fashion designer
 Davor Banović (born 1956) Croatian auditor, judicial expert
 Igor Banović (born 1987), Croatian footballer
 Ivan Banović (born 1984), Croatian footballer
 Ivica Banović (born 1980), Croatian footballer
 Ivo Banović (born 1940) professor of kinesiology
 Marko Banović (born 1967), Croatian rower
 Mladen Banović, Croatian engineer
 Patrik Banovič (born 1991), Slovak footballer
 Predrag Banović (born 1969), Bosnian Serb war criminal
 Petra Banović (born 1979), Croatian swimmer
 Strahinja Banović (died 1389), Medieval Serb hero
 Yakka Banovic (born 1956), Australian footballer of Croatian descent
 Zlatko Banović (born 1951) Croatian electrical engineer
 Zoran Banović (born 1977), Montenegrin footballer
 Zvonimir Banović (born 1923) Croatian physicist, professor

See also
 Banovići, town in Bosnia and Herzegovina

Serbian surnames
Croatian surnames